A&S may refer to:
Abraham & Straus, a defunct American department store
Abramowitz and Stegun, a 1964 mathematical reference book
Abilene and Southern Railway, a defunct American railroad
College of Arts and Sciences, an academic division at many higher education institutions